The Settembrini class was a pair of submarines built for the  (Royal Italian Navy) during the late 1920s. They played a minor role in the Spanish Civil War of 1936–1939 supporting the Spanish Nationalists.

Design and description
The Settembrini class was an improved and enlarged version of the preceding s. They displaced  surfaced and  submerged. Their crew numbered 56 officers and enlisted men.

For surface running, the boats were powered by two  diesel engines, each driving one propeller shaft. When submerged each propeller was driven by a  electric motor. They could reach  on the surface and  underwater.

The boats were armed with eight  torpedo tubes, four each in the bow and stern for which they carried a total of 12 torpedoes. They were also armed with a single  deck gun forward of the conning tower for combat on the surface. Their anti-aircraft armament consisted of two or four  machine guns.

Boats

Service history
During the Spanish Civil War, Luigi Settembrini made one patrol in the Eastern Mediterranean in September 1937 during which she sank a Soviet cargo ship.

Notes

References

External links
 Luigi Settembrini Marina Militare website

Submarine classes
 Settembrini
Submarines of the Regia Marina